Newport Covered Bridge, also known as the Morehead Covered Bridge and County Bridge No. 67, is a historic Burr Arch Truss covered bridge located in Vermillion Township, Vermillion County, Indiana.  It was built in 1885, and is a single span covered timber bridge.  It measures 210 feet long and 16 feet wide.  The bridge spans the Little Vermilion River.

It was listed on the National Register of Historic Places in 1994.

See also
Brouilletts Creek Covered Bridge
Eugene Covered Bridge
Possum Bottom Covered Bridge

References

Covered bridges on the National Register of Historic Places in Indiana
Bridges completed in 1885
Transportation buildings and structures in Vermillion County, Indiana
National Register of Historic Places in Vermillion County, Indiana
Road bridges on the National Register of Historic Places in Indiana
Wooden bridges in Indiana
Burr Truss bridges in the United States
1885 establishments in Indiana